The term regulatory state refers to the expansion in the use of rulemaking, monitoring and enforcement techniques and institutions by the state and to a parallel change in the way its positive or negative functions in society are being carried out. The expansion of the state nowadays is generally via regulation and less via taxing and spending. The notion of the regulatory state is increasingly more attractive for theoreticians of the state with the growth in the use and application of rule making, monitoring and enforcement strategies and with the parallel growth of civil regulation and business regulation. The rise of the regulatory state in the Industrial Revolution  can be traced to network regulation first instituted by William Gladstone in 1844. The co-expansion of state, civil and business regulation at the domestic and transnational arenas suggest that the notions of regulatory governance and regulatory capitalism are as usefully theoretically as the notion of regulatory state.

References

Public administration